White Plains High School is a high school in the White Plains Public Schools system of White Plains, New York, United States. It was selected by the U.S. Department of Education as a School of Excellence in 1986–1987. The school's code of conduct and state accountability report are available online.

Demographics
Gender: The student body is 50.11 percent female and 49.89 percent male.

Race: The student body is 59.55 percent Hispanic, 22.54 percent White, 12.88 percent Black, 3.36 percent Asian, and 1.68 percent other.

Publications
 Yearbook: The Oracle
 Newspaper: The Orange
 Literary magazine: The Roar

Athletics
The school makes available for its students two gymnasiums, a weight room, a track field and football field (Loucks Field), a soccer field, baseball and softball fields, tennis courts, and a pool.

White Plains football team won the Section 1 Class AA title in 2013 for the first time in 34 years.

White Plains High School Hall of Fame

Notable inductees:

T. Alexander Aleinikoff (1970) – United Nations Deputy High Commissioner for Refugees
David Corn (1977) – author and broadcast journalist
John Davidson (1959) – versatile singer, actor and entertainer with career spanning more than 55 years, including Broadway musicals, Disney movies, variety, game and talk shows on TV and Las Vegas showrooms
Robert Malcolm Graham (1963) – Massachusetts State Supreme Court Justice
Lawrence Otis Graham (1979) – author, attorney and broadcast commentator
Larry James (1966) – Olympic medal winner
James J. Jordan (1948) – advertising executive and copywriter (posthumous award)
Grover "Deacon" Jones (1952) – Major League Baseball player and coach
Philip Kent (1972) – CEO of Turner Broadcasting System, Inc.
Jonathan Larson (1978) – Pulitzer Prize-Winning playwright, Rent (posthumous award)
J. Bruce Llewellyn (1945) – business and civic leader
Dave Marash (1959) – broadcast journalist
Craig Masback (1973) – track champion, sports broadcaster, CEO of USA Track & Field
Art Monk (1976) – NFL wide receiver, Pro Football Hall of Fame inductee
Oscar Moore (1956) – U.S. Olympian runner, honored college track & field coach
Garrick Ohlsson (1966) – international concert pianist
Jimmy Roberts (1975) – Emmy Award-winning sports journalist and broadcaster
John Jay Saldi IV (1972) – football player; played more than 100 games over nine seasons in the National Football League for the Dallas Cowboys and the Chicago Bears; key member of Dallas' Super Bowl Champion (XII) team
David E. Sanger (1978) – Pulitzer Prize-winning journalist, White House Correspondent for The New York Times
Richard Schlesinger (1972) – broadcast journalist

Notable alumni
 Sam Bowers – football player
 David Corn – political journalist and author
 Sloane Crosley – author
 Jennifer Damiano – Broadway actress
 Dan Duryea (1924) – film and television actor
 Mal Graham – basketball player, 11th overall pick of 1967 NBA draft
 Larry James – Olympic gold medalist track athlete
 Grover "Deacon" Jones – retired first baseman for Chicago White Sox
 Sean Kilpatrick (born 1990) – basketball player for Brooklyn Nets and for Hapoel Jerusalem of the Israeli Basketball Super League
 Jonathan Larson – playwright and composer, best known for creating musical Rent
 Lou Mark – football player
 Matisyahu – Hasidic Jewish reggae musician
 Arthur Monk – NFL wide receiver, Pro Football Hall of Fame
 Dennis Morgan – football player
 Dick Nolan – football player
 Garrick Ohlsson – classical pianist
 Lawrence Otis Graham – attorney, journalist, and author
 Gordon Parks Jr. – film director of Super Fly, son of photographer Gordon Parks Sr.
 Jay Saldi – NFL tight end, Super Bowl champion (Super Bowl X)
 David E. Sanger – White House correspondent for New York Times
 Andrew S. Tanenbaum – computer scientist
 Chris Watson (born 1975) – American-Israeli basketball player
 Sal Yvars – professional baseball player

In film
Scenes from The Beaver, a film directed by Jodie Foster and starring Mel Gibson and Foster, were filmed at the high school in the fall of 2009. Scenes from the film Win Win, starring Paul Giamatti, were shot at the high school in March 2010.

References

High schools in White Plains, New York
Public high schools in Westchester County, New York